The 2021 Mainland Tactix season saw the Mainland Tactix netball team compete in the 2021 ANZ Premiership. With a team coached by Marianne Delaney-Hoshek, captained by Jane Watson and featuring Ellie Bird, Karin Burger, Erikana Pedersen, Kimiora Poi and Te Paea Selby-Rickit, Tactix finished the regular ANZ Premiership season in third place, behind Northern Mystics and Southern Steel. In the Elimination final, Tactix defeated Steel 54–49. However, in the grand final, they lost 61–59 to Mystics, finishing the season second overall.

Players

Player movements

2021 roster

Pre-season

Timaru series
Mainland Tactix played Southern Steel in a two match series in Timaru. Tactix won both matches.

Otaki tournament
Mainland Tactix participated in the official ANZ Premiership tournament at Te Wānanga o Raukawa in Otaki between 26 and 28 March. All six ANZ Premiership teams took part. With two wins and a draw, Tactix were the only team not to lose a match.

Regular season

Fixtures and results
Round 1

Round 2

Round 3

Round 4

Round 5

Round 6

Round 7

Round 8

Round 9

Round 10 

Round 11

Round 12

Round 13

Round 14

Round 15

Notes
  Tactix's Round 11 match against Central Pulse was postponed after a change in COVID-19 alert levels. The match was rescheduled for Friday, 9 July.

Final standings

Finals Series

Elimination final

Grand final

Award winners

New Zealand Netball Awards

References

2021
2021 ANZ Premiership season
2021 in New Zealand netball